Cheshmeh Bardi (also Romanized as Cheshmeh Bardī) is a village in Kuh Mareh Sorkhi Rural District, Arzhan District, Shiraz County, Fars Province, Iran. At the 2006 census, its population was 287, in 58 families.

References 

Populated places in Shiraz County